Boxtel railway station is located in Boxtel, Netherlands. The station was opened on 1 May 1865 and is located on the Breda–Eindhoven railway (between Tilburg and Eindhoven) and the Utrecht–Boxtel railway. The station is currently operated by Nederlandse Spoorwegen. Boxtel is an interchange station for Stoptreinen (trains stopping at every station) in North Brabant. There are services meeting in 3 different directions.

The station was majorly rebuilt from 1998, opening on 29 September 2000 as part of quadrupling of the Eindhoven to Boxtel line with a second island platform added.

The station lies at the start of the former Boxtel–Wesel railway.

Destinations

These are some of the destinations that are possible to reach from Boxtel:

Tilburg, Eindhoven, Helmond, Deurne and 's-Hertogenbosch.

The nearest major stations where all trains stop are:

Eindhoven railway station - for services to the south and east
's-Hertogenbosch railway station - for services to the north and east
Tilburg railway station - for services to the west and north

Train services
The following services currently call at Boxtel:
2x per hour local services (stoptrein) Tilburg Universiteit - Eindhoven
2x per hour local services (stoptrein) 's-Hertogenbosch - Eindhoven - Deurne

Bus services
203 - 's-Hertogenbosch - Boxtel - Liempde
204 - Best - Sint Oedenrode - Boxtel - Schijndel
299 - Oirschot - Boxtel - Sint Michielsgestel

References

External links
NS website 
Dutch Public Transport journey planner 

Boxtel
Railway stations in North Brabant
Railway stations opened in 1865
Railway stations on the Staatslijn E
Railway stations on the Staatslijn H